Cyborg 3: The Recycler is a 1994 American direct-to-video film and is sequel to Cyborg 2 (1993) starring Malcolm McDowell and Khrystyne Haje. Released on home video in 1995, the film is directed by Michael Schroeder. It is the third installment in the Cyborg film series.

Plot
The film is set in a desolate post-apocalyptic world where a once thriving age of man and cyborgs has come to an end. Cyborgs are now hunted for their parts. Cash (Haje), a female cyborg learns from Doc Edford (Margaret Avery) that she is somehow pregnant.

She searches for the fabled city of Cytown to find Evans (Zach Galligan), a creator of cyborgs, to find out more about her condition. She is followed by Anton Lewellyn (Richard Lynch) and his assistant Jocko (Andrew Bryniarski). Lewellyn is able to sustain himself by hunting cyborgs for their parts. Though he has long wanted to find Cytown (the last haven for cyborgs), he becomes obsessed in getting Cash and her child.

Cast

 Malcolm McDowell as Lord Talon
 Khrystyne Haje as Casella "Cash" Reese Cyborg
 Zach Galligan as Evans
 Richard Lynch as Anton Lewellyn
 Andrew Bryniarski as Jocko Cyborg
 Michael Bailey Smith as Donovan Cyborg
 William Katt as Decaf Cyborg
 Rebecca Ferratti as Elexia Cyborg
 Margaret Avery as Dr. Edford
 Raye Hollitt as Finola Cyborg
 Kato Kaelin as Beggar
 Evan Lurie as El-Sid Cyborg
 Bill Quinn as Hale Cyborg
 David McSwain as Ahab Cyborg

External links
 
 
 

1995 films
1995 independent films
1990s science fiction action films
American independent films
American science fiction action films
American sequel films
Direct-to-video sequel films
1990s English-language films
American post-apocalyptic films
Cyborg films
Cyborg (film series)
Films directed by Michael Schroeder
1990s American films